OGLE-TR-122 is a binary stellar system containing one of the smallest main-sequence stars whose radius has been measured.  It was discovered when the Optical Gravitational Lensing Experiment (OGLE) survey observed the smaller star eclipsing the larger primary.  The orbital period is approximately 7.3 days.  The system's primary is thought to resemble the Sun.  

The smaller star, OGLE-TR-122B, is estimated to have a radius around 0.12 solar radii, or around 20% larger than Jupiter's, and a mass of around 0.1 solar masses, or approximately 100 times Jupiter's. This makes its average density approximately 50 times the Sun's or over 80 times the density of water. OGLE-TR-122b's mass is close to the lowest possible mass for a hydrogen-fusing star, estimated to be around 0.07 or 0.08 solar masses.  The observed transit provides the first direct evidence for a star with a radius comparable to Jupiter's.

See also
 OGLE-TR-123
 EBLM J0555-57

References 

Carina (constellation)
Eclipsing binaries
Carinae, V817